Liam Tourki born 25 March 1999 is a French snowboarder who competed in the men's halfpipe at the 2022 Winter Olympics. Tourki has two top-20 finishes at two World Championships (2019, 2021). He currently resides in Doussard.

References

External links

1999 births
Living people
French male snowboarders
Olympic snowboarders of France
Snowboarders at the 2022 Winter Olympics
Sportspeople from Grenoble
21st-century French people